Muharram (Teluk Semanting, 7 February 1968 – Balikpapan, 22 September 2020) was an Indonesian politician, member of the Prosperous Justice Party. He served as Regent of Berau from 2016 until his death in office in 2020.

He was elected in the 2015 Indonesian local elections and took office on 17 February 2016, when he was officially inaugurated by Governor of East Kalimantan Awang Faroek Ishak along with his deputy, Agus Tamtomo.

He died of COVID-19 on 22 September 2020, at Pertamina Hospital in Balikpapan, during the pandemic in Indonesia, after being hospitalized for thirteen days.

References

1968 births
2020 deaths
Prosperous Justice Party politicians
Deaths from the COVID-19 pandemic in Indonesia